David Anthony Thomas Fane, 15th Earl of Westmorland,  (31 March 1924 – 8 September 1993), styled Lord Burghersh until 1948, was a British courtier, landowner and member of the House of Lords.

Early life and military service 

The elder son of Vere Fane, 14th Earl of Westmorland, by The Hon. Diana, daughter of Thomas Lister, 4th Baron Ribblesdale, he was accorded the courtesy title of Lord Burghersh from birth; his younger brother was the author The Hon. Julian Fane, FRSL (1927-2009).

Educated at Eton, he served as a Lieutenant in the Royal Horse Guards during the Second World War when he was wounded (MiD).

Later career and family 

In 1948 he succeeded in his father's earldom on the death of his father, becoming a Lord-in-waiting to Queen Elizabeth II between 1955 and 1978 and again between 1990 and 1993; he then served as Master of the Horse from 1978 to 1991. He was appointed a Knight Commander of the Royal Victorian Order (KCVO) in 1970 and promoted Knight Grand Cross of the Royal Victorian Order (GCVO) in 1991. The latter year he was also appointed a Deputy Lieutenant of Gloucestershire. Lord Westmorland was also a Commander of the Order of St John (CStJ).

He married Jane Barbara Findlay, daughter of Sir Roland Findlay Bt, on 20 June 1950; they had three children:

Anthony David Francis Henry Fane, 16th Earl of Westmorland (b. 1 August 1951)
Hon. Harry St. Clair Fane (b. 19 March 1953)
Lady Camilla Diana Fane (b. 26 December 1957).

Lord Westmorland died on 8 September 1993, aged 69, being succeeded in the earldom by his elder son, Anthony (previously Lord Burghersh).

He was a godfather to Lady Sarah Chatto, daughter of Princess Margaret and Antony Armstrong-Jones, 1st Earl of Snowdon.

See also 
 House of Lords
 Master of the Horse

References

External links

 www.hereditarypeers.com

1924 births
1993 deaths
People educated at Eton College
20th-century English nobility
David
Knights Grand Cross of the Royal Victorian Order
Permanent Lords-in-Waiting
Deputy Lieutenants of Gloucestershire
Commanders of the Order of St John
F
Tennant family
Earls of Westmorland
Barons Burghersh